"Game of Boyles" is the 7th episode of the eighth season of the American television police sitcom series Brooklyn Nine-Nine, and the 150th overall episode of the series. The episode was written by co-producer Paul Welsh and co-producer Madeline Walter and directed by Thembi Banks. It aired on September 2, 2021 on NBC, airing back-to-back with the follow-up episode, "Renewal".

The show revolves around the fictitious 99th precinct of the New York Police Department in Brooklyn and the officers and detectives that work in the precinct. In this episode, Jake and Terry accompany Charles to a family funeral. However, they find that the death was probably orchestrated by someone familiar with the family and set out to find the truth. Meanwhile, Holt has been arguing with Kevin about how many hours he needs to cut back on work, leading Rosa and Amy to suggest Holt use a dating app to make Kevin jealous.

According to Nielsen Media Research, the episode was seen by an estimated 1.84 million household viewers and gained a 0.4 ratings share among adults aged 18–49. The episode received mixed reviews from critics, with critics comparing the episode unfavorably to Knives Out and criticizing Boyle's storyline. Holt's storyline was much more favorably received, with his kiss with Kevin particularly receiving acclaim.

Plot
Charles's (Joe Lo Truglio) great-uncle, Pappy (Hal Alpert), dies. Jake (Andy Samberg) and Terry (Terry Crews) agree to accompany him to the funeral, which involves taking the coffin with them to get Pappy's body from the Boyle farm.

At the farm, Charles's cousin, Sam (Christopher Gehrman), explains that Pappy left no will and his son Lyndon (Gregg Binkley) could try to get his fortune. Jake then inspects the body and tells Charles's family that Pappy was poisoned and he suspects Lyndon was involved. Jake, Terry and Charles then question members of the family, who all claim that Lyndon was acting strangely at Pappy's birthday party. Lyndon admits arguing with Pappy, but it was not over the will, it was over missing a Zoom family meeting. Jake finds poison in the barn along with a piece of hair and has everyone in the house give a piece of their hair for a DNA test. However, when the results come back, Jake finds that all of the DNA of the Boyles indicates they are related, except for Charles.

Jake calls Charles's father Lynn, who states that Charles's mother had an affair with a rival florist, which resulted in his birth. Jake and Terry decide to solve the case before Charles learns of the DNA results. They keep investigating Lyndon but Jake finally discovers the truth: a nutria ate poison and then Pappy drank its milk, causing his death. However, Jake accidentally reveals that he got the DNA results and Charles discovers his true heritage. Jake also deduces that Sam hid Pappy's will as he was jealous of Charles delivering the eulogy at the funeral. Jake and Terry then help Charles feel better by giving him the dough jar that the Boyles believe only "the one true Boyle" can open. Despite Terry not being able to loosen it, Charles succeeds and is declared "the one true Boyle" by his relatives.

Meanwhile, Holt (Andre Braugher) states that his therapy sessions are not going anywhere and Kevin is pressuring him to reduce his work hours so Rosa (Stephanie Beatriz) suggests that he starts dating to make Kevin jealous. To Amy's (Melissa Fumero) surprise, Holt decides to do it. They deduce that he will not go out but they are shocked to see him enjoy an evening with a man, even intending to go over to his house. But Holt reveals that he knew their plan and played along. But the next day, he confesses to Amy and Rosa that he still feels lonely. Just then, Kevin (Marc Evan Jackson) calls his name from outside in the rain and Holt joins him. They proclaim their love for each other and kiss.

Production

Development
In August 2021, it was announced that the seventh episode of the season would be titled "Game of Boyles" and that co-producer Paul Welsh and co-producer Madeline Walter would serve as writers while Thembi Banks would direct. Despite being the seventh episode of the season to air, it was the sixth to be produced.

Reception

Viewers
According to Nielsen Media Research, the episode was seen by an estimated 1.84 million household viewers and gained a 0.4 ratings share among adults aged 18–49. This means that 0.4 percent of all households with televisions watched the episode. This was a 26% increase over the previous episode, which was watched by 1.45 million viewers and a 0.3 ratings share. With these ratings, Brooklyn Nine-Nine was the highest rated show on NBC for the night, fourth on its timeslot and fourth for the night, behind CMA Jam, Big Brother, and Thursday Night Football.

Critical reviews
"Game of Boyles" received mixed reviews from critics. Vikram Murthi of The A.V. Club gave the episode a "C+" rating, writing, "Forgettable from snout to anus, 'The Game of Boyles' is more dull than actively bad. Nevertheless, it stands as the weakest episode of the season so far."

Brian Tallerico of Vulture gave the episode a 2 star rating out of 5 and wrote, "The worst episode so far of the final season of Brooklyn Nine-Nine, 'Game of Boyles' centers the extremely unusual extended Boyle family, a joke that worked best when it had Chelsea Peretti's withering glare to counter its extreme affability, and hasn't really since she left. Is the final season really not going to include another heist? No sign of The Vulture? And yet here we've gotten another adventure for the over-emotional Boyle clan, and not even one that really feels like it has anything interesting to say thematically. It feels more like a script that didn't make it through the writers' room in a previous season, pulled out of the bottom drawer and dusted off for this one."

Nick Harley of Den of Geek wrote, "'Game of Boyles' is first and serves as a pseudo-parody of Knives Out. The problem here is that by this point, the film is almost two years old, and the parody feels stale. Also feeling stale are the Boyle family jokes."

References

External links

2021 American television episodes
Brooklyn Nine-Nine (season 8) episodes